Tafila Technical University (TTU) (Arabic جامعة الطفيلة التقنية), is a public university in Jordan. According to a royal decree which was issued to establish the Tafila Technical University (TTU), the (TTU) was founded in January,2005 in order to develop the educational process in Jordan.

Academics 
Tafila Technical University incorporates the following 7 colleges:
College of Arts
College of engineering
College of sciences
College of Business
College of Educational Sciences
College of Information Technology and Communication
Technical Community College

College of Arts 
The College of Arts offers B.A degrees in two programs: English Language and Literature and Arabic Language and Literature. The Department of Humanities and Social Sciences is a non degree-granting department.  In addition to that, the College of Arts offers educational courses for associate diploma students affiliated with the TTU's Intermediate Technical Community College.

College of engineering (Run) 
The College of Engineering was established on January 17, 2005. Now, it has five academic departments: Computer and Telecommunication Eng.,Electrical Eng., Mechanical Eng., Natural Resources Eng., and Civil engineering. It offers a B.Sce degrees. In the scholar year 2008–2009, the number of students is 1000.

College of sciences 
The college of sciences  has three academic departments: Applied Physics, Mathematics & IT, and Chemistry. Since the establishment of the college in 2005, the number of students has reached 750.

College of Information Technology and Communication 
The time has come for the completion of the completion of the generation of information, and accordingly, and its establishment came, the completion of the total completion of the development of the communications technology sector in Jordan and the region. It relies in its academic programs on keeping up with the latest developments in the field of information and communication technology by adhering to accreditation and quality standards in teaching, creating and adjusting education numbers in addition to progress in improvement and development. The beginning to achieve its goals keeps pace with the latest developments in the world of information technology.

College of Business 
It was established in 2005.  Now, it has three academic departments: Business Economics, Accounting, and Business Management.  It offers B.A degrees in the aforementioned majors.

College of Educational Sciences 
The CES offers B.A degrees in four programs: Child  Education, Special Education, Classroom-Teacher Education, and Classroom-Teacher/ English language. It also offers a higher diploma in education.  Additionally, the CES offers educational courses for associate diploma students affiliated to the TTU's Intermediate Technical Community College. There are (777) students in the CES. The number of faculty is 30 for the academic year 2008–2009

Centers 
There are six centers at TTU. Most of them are newly established and their work is mainly administrative. The centers are:
Computer & Information Technology Center (CITC)
This center was established around the end of 2006. The center maintains the university's network which uses a (Single Mode Fiber). All of the university buildings are connected to the LAN network and have access to the internet. In addition to that, the center maintains the wireless network that is available on campus. In addition to its technical role, the CITC holds regular computer courses for students, faculty members and the local community at large.
National Center for Oil Shale Research
Center of Faculty Performance Evaluation & Development
Quality Assurance Management Center
Community Partnership Center
The mission of the Community Partnership Center is to link university resources with urban and rural grassroots community groups to understand and address the core problems facing low- and moderate- income communities
Language Center
This center offers language courses for university students. it offers courses in English, Arabic, and French. In addition to that, it offers Arabic courses for non-speakers. Faculty members from the College of Arts teach these courses.

References

External links 
 

Educational institutions established in 2005
Tafilah Governorate
Universities in Jordan
2005 establishments in Jordan